The Mickey Mouse Club is an American variety television show that aired intermittently from 1955 to 1996 and returned to social media in 2017. Created by Walt Disney and produced by Walt Disney Productions, the program was first televised for four seasons, from 1955 to 1959, by ABC. This original run featured a regular, but ever-changing cast of mostly teen performers. ABC broadcast reruns weekday afternoons during the 1958–1959 season, airing right after American Bandstand. The show was revived three times after its initial 1955–1959 run on ABC, first from 1977 to 1979 for first-run syndication as The New Mickey Mouse Club, then from 1989 to 1996 as The All-New Mickey Mouse Club (also known to fans as MMC from 1993 to 1996) airing exclusively on cable television's The Disney Channel, and again in 2017 with the moniker Club Mickey Mouse airing exclusively on internet social media. It ended in 2018.

The character of Mickey Mouse appeared in every show, not only in vintage cartoons originally made for theatrical release, but also in the opening, interstitial, and closing segments made especially for the show. In both the vintage cartoons and new animated segments, Mickey was voiced by his creator Walt Disney (Disney had previously voiced the character theatrically from 1928 to 1947 before being replaced by sound effects artist Jimmy MacDonald).

Before the TV series
The first official theater-based Mickey Mouse Club began on January 11, 1930, at the Fox Dome Theater in Ocean Park, California, with 60 theaters hosting clubs by March 31. The Club released its first issue of the Official Bulletin of the Mickey Mouse Club on April 15, 1930. By 1932, the club had one million members, and in 1933 its first UK club opened at Darlington’s Arcade Cinema. In 1935, Disney began to phase out the club.

1955–1959 show

Members

The Mickey Mouse Club was hosted by Jimmie Dodd, a songwriter and the Head Mouseketeer, who provided leadership both on and off the screen. In addition to his other contributions, he often provided short segments which encouraged younger viewers to make the right moral choices. These little homilies became known as "Doddisms". Roy Williams, a staff artist at Disney, also appeared in the show as the Big Mouseketeer. Williams suggested that the Mickey and Minnie Mouse ears should be worn by the show's cast members. He helped create these ears, along with Chuck Keehne, Hal Adelquist, and Bill Walsh.

The main cast members were called Mouseketeers, and they performed in a variety of musical and dance numbers, as well as some informational segments. The most popular of the Mouseketeers constituted the so-called Red Team, which was kept under contract for the entire run of the show (1955–1959), and its members included:
 Sharon Baird
 Bobby Burgess
 Lonnie Burr
 Tommy Cole
 Annette Funicello
 Darlene Gillespie
 Cubby O'Brien
 Karen Pendleton
 Doreen Tracey

Other Mouseketeers who were Red Team members but did not star on the show for all three seasons included:
 Cheryl Holdridge (second and third year)
 Nancy Abbate (only first year)
 Johnny Crawford (only first year)
 Dennis Day (first and second year; was in the blue team for most of the first year, but he moved to the red team at the end of the first year)
 Mike Smith (only first year)
 Jay-Jay Solari (only second year)
 Don Underhill (only first year; joined the blue team by the end of the first year)

The remaining Mouseketeers, who were members of the White or Blue Teams, were Don Agrati (who was later known as Don Grady when he starred as "Robbie" on My Three Sons), Sherry Alberoni, Billie Jean Beanblossom, Eileen Diamond, Dickie Dodd (not related to Jimmie Dodd), Mary Espinosa, Bonnie Lynn Fields, Judy Harriet, Linda Hughes, Dallas Johann, John Lee Johann, Bonni Lou Kern, Charlie Laney, Larry Larsen, Paul Petersen, Lynn Ready, Mickey Rooney Jr., Tim Rooney, Mary Sartori, Bronson Scott, Margene Storey, Ronnie Steiner, and Mark Sutherland. Larry Larsen, on only for the 1956–57 season, was the oldest Mouseketeer, being born in 1939, and Bronson Scott, on only the 1955–56 season, was the youngest Mouseketeer, being born in July 1947. Among the thousands who auditioned but did not make the cut were future Oscar-winning vocalist/songwriter Paul Williams and future Primetime Emmy Award-winning actress Candice Bergen.

The 39 Mouseketeers and the seasons in which they were featured (with the team color which they belonged to are listed for each season):

Notes: Cole and Day were originally Blue Team members, but were drafted to the Red Team later in the first season.

Johann, Petersen, and the Rooney brothers were all let go early in the first season. Dallas's brother John Lee replaced him, while Dodd and Steiner were hired as replacements for the Rooney brothers.

For the show's fourth season, only a small amount of new footage was filmed and was interspliced with material from previous seasons. It is believed that only six of the Mouseketeers—Funicello, Gillespie, Tracey, Burgess, Pendleton, and O'Brien—were called back for the filming of new material, while Cole and Baird were merely used for some publicity material.

Adult co-hosts
 Jimmie Dodd
 Roy Williams
 Bob Amsberry

Other notable non-Mouseketeer performers appeared in several dramatic segments:
 Tim Considine
 Tommy Kirk
 Roberta Shore (Jymme Shore)
 David Stollery
 Judy Nugent
 Kevin Corcoran, a.k.a. Moochie
 J. Pat O'Malley
 Sammy Ogg
 Alvy Moore
 Julius Sumner Miller as "Professor Wonderful"

These non-Mouseketeers primarily appeared in several original serials filmed for the series, only some of which have appeared in reruns. Other Mouseketeers were also featured in some of the serials, particularly Annette Funicello and Darlene Gillespie.

Major serials
Major serials included:
 Spin and Marty starring Tim Considine and David Stollery
 The Hardy Boys  starring Tim Considine and Tommy Kirk
 Corky and White Shadow, starring Darlene Gillespie
 Walt Disney Presents: Annette, starring Annette Funicello
 Adventure in Dairyland, featuring Annette Funicello and Sammy Ogg, and introducing Kevin Corcoran as Moochie
 Jiminy Cricket educational serials (four animated shorts educating kids on different topics)
 The Adventures of Clint and Mac (starring Neil Wolfe as Clint Rogers and Jonathan Bailey as Alastair "Mac" MacIntosh)
 Boys of the Western Sea (English-dubbed Danish film divided into nine 10-minute segments)

Music
The opening theme, "The Mickey Mouse March", was written by the show's primary adult host, Jimmie Dodd. It was also reprised at the end of each episode, with the slower "it's time to say goodbye" verse. A shorter version of the opening title was used later in the series, in syndication, and on Disney Channel reruns. Dodd also wrote many other songs used in individual segments throughout the series.

Show themes
Each day of the week had a special show theme, which was reflected in the several segments. The themes were:
 Monday – Fun with Music Day
 Tuesday – Guest Star Day
 Wednesday – Anything Can Happen Day
 Thursday – Circus Day
 Friday – Talent Round-up Day

Scheduling and air times
The series ran on ABC Television for an hour each weekday in the 1955 and the 1956 seasons (from 5:00 - 6:00 pm ET), and only a half-hour weekdays in 1957, the final season to feature new programming. Although the show returned for a 1958 season and these programs were repeats from the first two seasons, recut into a half-hour format. The Mickey Mouse Club was featured on Mondays, Wednesdays, and Fridays, and Walt Disney's Adventure Time, featuring reruns of The Mickey Mouse Club serials and several re-edited segments from Disneyland and Walt Disney Presents, appeared on Tuesdays and Thursdays.

Cancellation
Although the show remained popular, ABC decided to cancel it after its fourth season ended, because Disney and the ABC network could not come to terms for its renewal. The cancellation of the show in September 1959 was attributed to several factors: the Disney studios did not explain high profit margins from merchandise sales, sponsors were uninterested in educational programming for children, and many commercials were needed to pay for the show. After canceling The Mickey Mouse Club, ABC also refused to let Disney air the show on another network. Walt Disney filed a lawsuit against ABC, and won the damages in a settlement, the following year; however, he had to agree that both the Mickey Mouse Club and Zorro could not be aired on any major network. This left Walt Disney Presents (initially titled Disneyland, later retitled Walt Disney's Wonderful World of Color when it moved to NBC) as the only Disney series which was left on prime time until 1972 when The Mouse Factory went on the air. The prohibition which prevented major U.S. broadcast networks from airing the original Mickey Mouse Club (or any later version of it) was disputed when Disney acquired ABC in 1996. Although it would not air on ABC again, Disney ran it on the Disney Channel's "Vault Disney" block from 1998 to 2002.

Australian tour
Although the series had been ended in America, many members of the cast assembled for highly successful tours of Australia in 1959 and 1960. The television series was very successful in Australia and was still running on Australian television. The cast surprised Australian audiences, as by then they had physically matured and in some cases, bore little resemblance to the cast of youths with whom Australians were so familiar. Mainstream television did not reach Australia until 1956, so the series screened well into the 1960s when the back catalog expired.

Syndication
In response to continuing audience demand, the original Mickey Mouse Club went into edited syndicated half-hour reruns that enjoyed wide distribution starting in the fall of 1962, achieving strong ratings especially during its first three seasons in syndicated release. Because of its popularity in some markets, a few stations continued to carry it into 1968 before the series was finally withdrawn from syndication. Some new features were added such as Fun with Science or "Professor Wonderful" (with scientist Julius Sumner Miller) and Marvelous Marvin in the 1964–1965 season; Jimmie Dodd appeared in several of these new segments before his death in November 1964. Several markets expanded the program back to an hour's daily run time during the 1960s repeat cycle by adding locally produced and hosted portions involving educational subjects and live audience participation of local children, in a manner not unlike Romper Room.

In response to an upsurge in demand from baby boomers entering adulthood, the show again went into syndicated reruns from January 20, 1975, until January 14, 1977. It has since been rerun on cable specialty channels Disney in the United States and Family in Canada. The original Mickey Mouse Club films aired five days a week on The Disney Channel from its launch in 1983 until the third version of the series began in 1989. The last airing of the edited 1950s material was on Disney Channel's Vault Disney from 1997 to September 2002. During the baseball seasons in 1975 and 1976, WGN-TV in Chicago, Illinois, aired the show on a delayed basis due to Cubs baseball coverages.

Reunions
Annette Funicello and Tim Considine were reunited on The New Mickey Mouse Club in 1977. Darlene Gillespie and Cubby O'Brien were also reunited on another episode of the same series.

31 out of the 39 original Mouseketeers were reunited for a TV special, which aired on Disney's Wonderful World in November 1980. Paul Williams – who hosted the special – and Tim Considine were named Honorary Mousketeers during the special.

Cast members Annette Funicello, Bobby Burgess, Tommy Cole, Sharon Baird, Don Grady, and Sherry Alberoni were reunited on the 100th episode of The All-New Mickey Mouse Club, during the show's third season in 1990.
 
Mouseketeers Doreen Tracey, Cubby O'Brien, Sherry Alberoni, Sharon Baird, Don Grady, Cheryl Holdridge, Bobby Burgess, Karen Pendleton, Tommy Cole, and Mary Espinosa performed together at Disneyland in Fall 2005, in observance of Disneyland's 50th birthday, and the 50th anniversary of the television premiere of The Mickey Mouse Club.

Streaming
In early 2020, the first week of the Mickey Mouse Club and the first Spin and Marty serial have been added to Disney's new streaming platform Disney+. For some reason, it is currently missing.

Talent Roundup stars
 Larry Ashurst
 Janice Crowe
 Peter Lee Palmer
 Mark Sutherland
 Bo Wagner
 Pamela Beaird
 Mary Sartori
 John F. Smith
 Maxine Grossman
 Linda Hughes
 Cheryl Weinberg
 Ronnie Wilson
 Riley Wilson
 Jimmie Fields
 Donna Loren
 Ray Little

1977 revival: The New Mickey Mouse Club
In 1977, Walt Disney Productions revived the concept, but modernized the show cosmetically, with a disco re-recording of the theme song and a more ethnically diverse group of young cast members. The sets were brightly colored and simpler than the detailed black and white artwork of the original. Like the original, nearly every day's episode included a vintage cartoon, though usually in color from the late 1930s onward. The 1977 Mouseketeers were part of the halftime show of Super Bowl XI on January 9, 1977.

Serials
Serials were usually old Disney movies, cut into segments for twice-weekly inclusion. Movies included Third Man on the Mountain, The Misadventures of Merlin Jones and its sequel The Monkey's Uncle (both starring Tommy Kirk), Emil and the Detectives (retitled The Three Skrinks), Tonka (retitled A Horse Called Comanche), The Horse Without a Head (about a toy horse), and Toby Tyler (starring Kevin Corcoran). In addition, one original serial was produced, The Mystery of Rustler's Cave, starring Kim Richards and Robbie Rist. Often shown were scenes from animated Disney films, from Snow White to The Jungle Book billed as "Mouseka Movie Specials".

Theme days
Theme days were:
 Monday: Who, What, Why, Where, When and How
 Tuesday: Let's Go
 Wednesday: Surprise
 Thursday: Discovery
 Friday: Showtime (at Disneyland, with performers usually at Plaza Gardens)

Syndication
The series debuted on January 17, 1977, on 38 local television stations in the United States, and by June of that same year, when the series was discontinued, about 70 stations in total had picked up the series. Additional stations picked up the canceled program, which continued to run until January 12, 1979; 130 new episodes, with much of the original material repackaged and a bit of new footage added, and a shortened version of the theme song, was produced to start airing September 5, 1977. Since the 1970s, the series has aired only briefly in reruns. Like its 1950s predecessor, the 1989/1990s series had DVD releases of select episodes in July 2005. On November 20, 1977, "The Mouseketeers at Walt Disney World" was shown on The Wonderful World of Disney. WGN-TV in Chicago, Illinois, also aired this version on a delayed basis in 1977 and 1978 during the Cubs baseball season due to game coverages. Action for Children's Television successfully got the show canceled because of their objections to the types of commercials that aired during the program. It also aired on BBC One in the United Kingdom from 1978 to 1980.

Cast
The cast of 12 (five boys and seven girls) had a more diverse multiethnic background than the 1950s version. Several 1977–1978 cast members went on to become TV stars and other notable icons.

The show's most notable alumnus was Lisa Whelchel (born in 1963, in Littlefield, Texas), who later starred in the NBC television sitcom The Facts of Life which ran from 1979 to 1988 before becoming a well-known Christian author, and overall runner-up, and winner of the $100,000 viewers' choice award, on the fall 2012 season of the CBS television reality series Survivor. Mouseketeer Julie Piekarski (born in 1963 in St. Louis, Missouri.) also appeared with Lisa Whelchel on the first season of The Facts of Life. Kelly Parsons (born in 1964, in Coral Gables, Florida) went on to become a beauty queen and runner-up to Miss USA.

Other Mouseketeers (from seasons 1–2) from the 1977 show:
 William "Billy"/"Pop" Attmore: born at US military base in Landstuhl, West Germany, 1965; appeared in a few movies before and after the series, a final season episode of The Brady Bunch ("Kelly's Kids"), and as a streetwise hood in the short-lived Eischied crime drama.
 Scott Craig: born in Van Nuys, California, in 1964; lived in Las Vegas, Nevada, died December 30, 2003, from a respiratory illness.
 Benita "Nita Dee" DiGiampaolo: born in Long Beach, California, in 1966; appeared at the last end of an episode in 1981 of Fantasy Island as Elena. Nita appeared in ABC Family Weekends in 1978 as Nita and 1978 as Maria. Nita also starred in Upbeat Aesop (ABC) produced by Ron Miziker (A Disney executive).
 Mindy Feldman: born in Burbank, California, in 1968; sister of actor Corey Feldman.
 Angel Florez: born in Stockton, California, in 1963; died April 25, 1995, from an AIDS-related illness.
 Allison Fonte: born in Buena Park, California, in 1964.
 Shawnte Northcutte born in Los Angeles, California, in 1965; appeared on an episode of The Facts of Life, as Madge.
 Todd Turquand: born in Hollywood, California, in 1964.
 Curtis Wong: born in Vancouver, British Columbia, Canada in 1962; appeared on an episode of Diff'rent Strokes, as an assistant karate instructor under Soon-Tek Oh.

Disney voice actor and sound effects editor Wayne Allwine voiced Mickey Mouse in the animated lead-ins for the show, replacing Jimmy MacDonald, who in 1947 had replaced Walt Disney as the voice of Mickey for theatrical short cartoons. Walt Disney had been the original voice of Mickey and for the original 1954–1959 run provided the voice for animated introductions to the original TV show but had died in 1966. Allwine kept providing the voice for the character up to his death in 2009.

Future rock musician Courtney Love (wife of Nirvana lead singer Kurt Cobain) claims to have auditioned for a part on the show, reading a poem by Sylvia Plath; she was not selected.

Former Mouseketeers Annette Funicello and serial star Tim Considine guest-starred in one episode; Former Mouseketeers Darlene Gillespie and Cubby O'Brien were also reunited on another episode.

Theme song and soundtrack
The lyrics of the "Mickey Mouse Club March" theme song were slightly different from the original, with two additional lines: "He's our favorite Mouseketeer; we know you will agree" and "Take some fun and mix in love, our happy recipe".

A soundtrack album was released with the show.

A new rendition of the "Mickey Mouse Club March" was made later on in 1999 by Mannheim Steamroller, a contemporary band, in hopes of connecting new-age children and their parents who watched the Mickey Mouse Club.

Distribution
This incarnation was not distributed by Disney only; while Disney did produce the series, it was co-produced and distributed by SFM Entertainment, which also handled 1970s-era syndication of the original 1950s series (Disney since re-acquired only distribution rights).

1989–1994 revival: The All-New Mickey Mouse Club
Reruns of the original The Mickey Mouse Club began airing on The Disney Channel with the channel's 1983 launch. While the show was popular with younger audiences, the Disney Channel executives felt it had become dated over the years, particularly as it was aired in black-and-white. Their answer was to create a brand-new version of the club, one targeted at contemporary audiences. Notably, the all-new "club-members" would wear Mouseketeer varsity jackets instead of iconic Mickey Mouse ears. This show was called The All-New Mickey Mouse Club (also known as "MMC" to fans).

This version of the series is notable for featuring a number of cast members who went on to achieve global success in music and acting, Ryan Gosling, Britney Spears, Christina Aguilera, future NSYNC band members Justin Timberlake and JC Chasez, Keri Russell, Deedee Magno, future En Vogue member Rhona Bennett, Nikki DeLoach, and Chase Hampton. Nick Carter was selected to join the program at the age of 12, however, he decided to join the developing boy band, Backstreet Boys.

Throughout the run, Fred Newman was the main adult co-host from the beginning of the series until season 6. In the first season, Newman was joined by other co-host Mowava Pryor. She was then replaced by Terri Eoff from the fourth season until the sixth season. By the show's final season, two original members Chase Hampton and Tiffini Hale became the co-hosts.

This was the first version of the club to have any studio audience, though a moderately small group.

Former Mouseketeer Don Grady guest-starred in the season 1 finale. Grady, along with fellow Mouseketeers Annette Funicello, Bobby Burgess, Tommy Cole, Sharon Baird, and Sherry Alberoni were reunited on the 100th episode, during the show's third season. Funicello later appeared on the show again, in an interview with the Mouseketeer Lindsey Alley.

Scheduling and air times
For the first five seasons, the series aired Monday through Friday at 5:30 pm. The show's sixth season aired Monday to Thursday. In its final season, it aired Thursdays only at 7:00 pm (later moved a half hour later, to 7:30 pm). The series premiered Monday, April 24, 1989, ended production in October 1994, and aired its last original episode in 1996. Seasons 3 and 5 had the most episodes at 55 each, with seasons 1, 2, and 7 running about 45 episodes. Seasons 4 and 6 had about 36 episodes each.

Skits
The show was known for its sketch comedy. Some of the sketches played off famous movies, musicals, and even cartoons, as well as holiday-related skits. During the final season, some of the skits showed everyday occurrences in the lives of adolescents.

Music videos
The series featured music videos of the Mouseketeers singing their versions of popular songs in front of a live studio audience or the Walt Disney World Resort. This became one of the most popular segments.

Live concerts and performances
A unique feature of the show was the Mouseketeers performing concerts on different days (which were usually taped the day before or in the summer, when the kids had more time). During the final season, the concerts were replaced primarily by live performances that featured singing and dancing in front of the audience.

Theme days
This version maintained the "theme day" format from the previous two versions. When Disney decided to revamp the show for its final season, the show was reduced to a single weekly airing, shown only on Thursdays. Although still produced as a daily series during the final season taping in 1994, The Disney Channel, after canceling the series once season 7 production had ended, decided to air the final season in a weekly format, therefore stretching the first-run episodes into early 1996. The final season premiered in May 1995, almost a year after production had started and more than 6 months after the series finale was taped.

Theme days were:
 Music Day – Mondays (seasons 1–5), Tuesdays (season 6)
 Guest Day – Tuesdays (seasons 1–5), Mondays (season 6)
 Anything Can Happen Day – Wednesdays (seasons 1–5)
 Party Day – Thursdays (seasons 1–4, 6), Fridays (season 5)
 Hall of Fame Day – Fridays (seasons 1–4), Thursdays (season 5), Wednesdays (season 6)

Mouseketeer roster
The adult co-hosts for the show were Fred Newman (1989–1993), Mowava Pryor (1989–1990), Terri Misner Eoff (1991–1993), Tiffini Hale (1994), and Chase Hampton (1994).

The 35 Mouseketeers and the seasons in which they were featured are:

Note: For the show's fourth season, Albert Fields, Tiffini Hale, Chase Hampton, Deedee Magno, and Damon Pampolina were featured in segments as "The Party", primarily in footage separate from the rest of the cast.

Emerald Cove
During the last three seasons of MMC they had a pre-recorded drama series called Emerald Cove with the older cast members:
Rhona Bennett
J.C. Chasez
Dale Godboldo 
Ricky Luna
Tony Lucca 
Ilana Miller
Keri Russell
Marc Worden 
Matt Morris
Jennifer McGill
Joshua Ackerman
Nikki Deloach

2017–2018 American revival: Club Mickey MouseThe Mickey Mouse Club was rebooted under the name Club Mickey Mouse with a new set of Mouseketeers in September 2017, and for the first time, the series was made available on Facebook and Instagram, rather than its original half hour to full hour format on television, and is more like a reality show than a variety show, with about 90% of its content being behind the scenes. This incarnation of The Mickey Mouse Club featured eight Mouseketeers who ranged in age from 15 to 18: Regan Aliyah, Jenna Alvarez, Ky Baldwin, Gabe De Guzman, Leanne Tessa Langston, Brianna Mazzola, Sean Oliu, and Will Simmons. The Mouseketeers were also joined by the guest star Todrick Hall, who also served as a mentor to the cast during the casting, and Jennifer Chia as the host. The series was produced by Disney Digital Network. No new episodes or music videos have been produced since 2018.

International revivals

 2015 Korean revival: The Mickey Mouse Club 
A new version of the series debuted on July 23, 2015, on Disney Channel Korea. The format of revival included musical performances, games, and skits, as same as the original one in the US. The series had two pilot episodes and ten regular episodes. The Mouseketeers consisted of nine members of S.M. Entertainment's pre-debut group SM Rookies, including five boys – Mark, Jeno, Haechan, Jaemin, and Jisung – and four girls – Koeun, Hina, Herin, and Lami.

The series was hosted by Leeteuk of boy band Super Junior.

The show ended on December 17 the same year.

2017–present Malaysian revival: Club Mickey MouseClub Mickey Mouse was created in Malaysia. The format included musical performances, games and comedy sketches.

The series was hosted by YouTube personality, Charis Ow, and premiered on Disney Channel Asia on September 15, 2017. The series was renewed for a second season, which premiered on July 6, 2018, and a third season which premiered on June 14, 2019. They also cast as a guest (except Dheena Menon which she had an exam) on Episode 14 ("Friends in Need, Indeed!") on Disney Channel Asia Original Series, Wizards of Warna Walk.

Charis and Dheena did not return in the season because Charis was getting married. Disney Channel Asia decided to pick two new Mouseketeers for an audition, revealed to be Eric and Melynna. But due to the shutdown of the channels, the season 4 of Club Mickey Mouse was aired in 2021 exclusively on Disney+ Hotstar instead.

In November 2021, it was reported that the fourth season of this show will be aired on Disney+ in selected territories.

Home media
 Walt Disney Treasures: The Mickey Mouse Club at UltimateDisney.com
 Mickey Mouse Club: Best of Britney, Justin & Christina at UltimateDisney.com

See also
 Disney Club, the name of many television shows associated to Disney productions aired mostly in Europe
 Mickey Mouse Clubhouse'', a show for preschool-age children with a very different format

References

External links
 
  (1950s version)
  (1970s version)
  (1989–1990s version)

 
1955 American television series debuts
1959 American television series endings
1960 American television series debuts
1977 American television series endings
1989 American television series debuts
1996 American television series endings
1950s American children's television series
1960s American children's comedy television series
1970s American children's comedy television series
1980s American children's comedy television series
1990s American children's comedy television series
1950s American music television series
1960s American musical comedy television series
1970s American musical comedy television series
1980s American musical comedy television series
1990s American musical comedy television series
1950s American sketch comedy television series
1960s American sketch comedy television series
1970s American sketch comedy television series
1980s American sketch comedy television series
1990s American sketch comedy television series
1950s American variety television series
1960s American variety television series
1970s American variety television series
1980s American variety television series
1990s American variety television series
American Broadcasting Company original programming

American children's musical television series
American television series revived after cancellation
American television series with live action and animation
Black-and-white American television shows
Child musical groups
Children's sketch comedy
Disney Channel original programming
Donald Duck television series
English-language television shows
Mickey Mouse television series
 
Television series about children
Television series by Disney
Television series created by Walt Disney
Television series created by Hal Adelquist